Stellar 7 is a first-person shooter tank simulation video game based on the arcade game Battlezone in which the player assumes the role of a futuristic tank pilot. The game was originally created by Damon Slye for the Apple II and Commodore 64 in 1983. It was followed by three sequels, Arcticfox (1986), Nova 9: The Return of Gir Draxon (1991), and Stellar 7: Draxon's Revenge (1993), and was remade in the early 1990s for the 16-bit computers.

Gameplay

The player's tank, the Raven, has a front-facing cannon with an unlimited supply of bullets. The cannon can fire up to two shots at a time. The tank also has a cloaking device that, when triggered, would render it invisible to enemies for about a minute. Gauges on the right side of the screen indicate the amount of shields and power remaining. The tank starts with enough power to cloak twice, and power slowly trickles away as the time passes. The game ends when either shields or power runs out.

Each of the seven levels represents a different star system (hence the title). The player's objective is to get to the last level and defeat the enemy boss, Gir Draxon. Each level is depicted as a nearly featureless plane dotted by geometric obstacles—some indestructible and most not—and various enemies. After the player destroys a certain number of enemies, a warp link will appear that provides a gateway to the next level.

Special power-ups can be accessed by pressing the tab key to toggle between the different icons at the bottom left of the screen and then pushing enter, or simply by pushing the letter key corresponding to the desired icon. The icon for the chosen item will turn purple while activated. Each power-up is represented by a certain symbol and can be used up to three times throughout the game, depending on the difficulty setting.

The later DOS / PC version of this game was somewhat different. The graphics were more advanced and rendered in a full range of colors for the time, as were the more complex world background paintings. Also, the cloaking device was not integrated into the tank and did not end the game or destroy the tank when it ended. Each world also was guarded by a boss that had to be defeated before the warp-link to the next level would appear. Most of the bosses were not particularly complicated compared to the sequel (Nova 9), but they presented a reasonable challenge for the time. The power-up system also worked differently. By killing 3 of specific enemy types, a power-up would get dropped, which would then activate when touched; different enemies produced different power-ups following this system. Finally, the game had a "Continue" feature, vs simply ending when the tank was destroyed. Other differences may have existed between the enemy types and behaviors; the same applies to power-ups.

Plot
Gir Draxon, an evil alien overlord in charge of a powerful interstellar empire has conquered a range of star systems and has now arrived in our solar system on Mars, intending on crushing humanity. The hero of the story has a super-tank that he can use to defeat Draxon's forces, though it was called into service before being finished and thus is protected only by energy shields and has no armor. From a game mechanics perspective, this explains why the tank simply is destroyed when its shields (hit points) run out. The hero fights his way through 7 star systems controlled by Draxon's empire, until arriving on the last planetArcturus itselfto face Gir Draxon. The alien overlord confronts the hero in personal combat in his own super-tank; when defeated, an escape pod is clearly seen rocketing off into space, making it clear that Draxon survived. 

Note that the second game in the series (Nova 9) would vastly expand the in-game plot, adding cut scenes, dialog, and more story-related tension. Not much information is provided about the world's background at the time.

Reception
Softline stated in 1983 that "Combining first-rate graphics and sound effects with fast-paced, arcade-style excitement makes Stellar 7 hard to beat in every sense". Video magazine reviewed the Apple II version of the game, describing it as "a severe test for even the most skillful home arcaders" whose "varied action makes it a particularly satisfying game for solo players." Tom Clancy in 1988 named Stellar 7 one of his two favorite computer games, stating that "it is so unforgiving, it is just like life". In 1991 the DOS version of the remake received 5 out of 5 stars in Dragon.

Reviews
Commodore User (Apr, 1985)

References

External links

Stellar 7  at Hardcore Gaming 101
Disassembly and analysis of the Apple II version

1983 video games
1990 video games
Amiga games
Apple II games
Commodore 64 games
DOS games
First-person shooters
Classic Mac OS games
Tank simulation video games
U.S. Gold games
Video games developed in the United States
Dynamix games
Single-player video games
Penguin Software games